Shiv Kumar Batalvi (23 July 1936 - 6 May 1973) was an Indian poet, writer and playwright of the Punjabi language. He was most known for his romantic poetry, noted for its heightened passion, pathos, separation and lover's agony, due to that he was also called Virha Da Sultan.

He became the youngest recipient of the Sahitya Akademi Award in 1967, given by the Sahitya Akademi (India's National Academy of Letters), for his epic verse play based on the ancient legend of Puran Bhagat, Loona (1965), now considered a masterpiece in modern Punjabi literature, and which also created a new genre, of modern Punjabi kissa. Today, his poetry stands in equal footing, amongst that by stalwarts of modern Punjabi poetry, like Mohan Singh (poet) and Amrita Pritam, all of whom are popular on both sides of Indo-Pakistan border.

Biography
Shiv Kumar Batalvi was born on 23 July 1936 (though a few documents related to him state 8 October 1937) in village Bara Pind Lohtian in the Shakargarh Tehsil of Sialkot District (now in Narowal District of Punjab, Pakistan) into a Punjabi Hindu Brahmin family to father, Pandit Krishan Gopal Sharma, the village tehsildar in the revenue department, and mother, Shanti Devi, a housewife.

In 1947, when he was aged 11, his family moved to Batala, Gurdaspur district after partition of India, where his father continued his work as a patwari and young Shiv received his primary education. Allegedly, he was a dreamy child, often vanishing for the duration of the day, to be found lying under trees by the riverbank close to the Mandir or Hindu temple outside the village, lost in a brown reverie. He appears to have been fascinated by local renditions of the Hindu epic Ramayana, as well as wandering minstrel singers, snake charmers and the like – which feature as metaphors in his poetry, giving it a uniquely rural flavour.

Personal life 
He met a girl named Maina at a fair in Baijnath. When he went back to look for her in her hometown, he heard the news of her death and wrote his elegy Maina. This episode was to prefigure numerous other partings that would serve as material to distil into poems. Perhaps the most celebrated such episode is his fascination for Gurbaksh Singh Preetlari's daughter who left for the Venezuela and married someone else. When he heard of the birth of her first child, Shiv wrote 'Main ik shikra yaar banaya', perhaps his most famous love poem. It's said that when she had her second child, someone asked Shiv whether he would write another poem. Shiv replied "Have I become responsible for her? Am I to write a poem on her every time she gives birth to a child?"

The poem 'Main ek shikra yaar banaya' is in the Punjabi Language, the English translation of this poem is also equally beautiful. Shiv Kumar Batalvi's poems have been sung by famous singers such as Nusrat Fateh Ali Khan, Ghulam Ali, Jagjit Singh, Hans Raj Hans, and many others.

On 5 February 1967 he married, Aruna, a Brahmin girl from his own caste. She is from Kiri Mangyal, Gurdaspur district, and later the couple had two children, Meharban (1968) and Puja (1969).

Education
He completed his matriculation in 1953, from Panjab University, and enrolled in the F.Sc. program at Baring Union Christian College, Batala, though before completing his degree he moved to S.N. College, Qadian, where he joined the Arts program more suited to his persona, though he left that too in the second year. Thereafter he joined a school at Baijnath, Himachal Pradesh to do a diploma in Civil Engineering, here again he left it in the middle. Next he studied for some time at Govt. Ripudaman College, Nabha.

Youngest recipient of Sahitya Akademi Award
Later in life, his father got a job as patwari at Qadian, it was during this period, that he produced some of his best work. His first anthology of poems was published in 1960, titled Piran da Paraga (A handful of pain), which became an instant success. Some senior writers of Batlaviji, including Jaswant Singh Rahi, Kartar Singh Balgan and Barkat Ram Yumman, as the saying goes, took him under their wings. In 1965, he became the youngest recipient of the Sahitya Akademi Award in 1967, for his magnum opus, a verse play Loona (1965). His poetry recitations, and singing his own verse, made he and his work even more popular amongst the masses.

Soon after his marriage, in 1968, he shifted to Chandigarh, where he joined the State Bank of India, as a professional. In the following years, bad health plagued him, though he continued to write prolifically.

Trip to England
In May 1972, Shiv visited England on the invitation of Dr. Gupal Puri and Mrs. Kailash Puri. He had been looking forward to his first trip abroad as a welcome relief from the drudgery of his life in Chandigarh. When he arrived in England, his popularity and fame had already reached a high point among the Punjabi community. His arrival was announced in the local Indian papers with headlines and pictures. [Takhar. Int. 2002]. He spent a busy time in England. A number of public functions and private parties were arranged in his honour where he recited his poetry. Dr. Gupal Puri arranged the first large function in Coventry, near London, to welcome Shiv. A large number of his fans and Punjabi poets, including Santokh Singh Dhir, Kuldip Takhar and Tarsem Purewal and many others attended this function. Another large gathering was organised at Rochester (Kent) in his honour. The famous artist S. Sobha Singh was also present who had travelled on his own expense to see Shiv. His engagements in England were regularly reported in the local Indian media and the BBC Television once interviewed him. While Punjabi community got their opportunity to listen to Shiv on various occasions, his stay in London proved to be the last straw for his failing health. He would stay late and continue to drink until 2:00 or 2:30 in the morning at parties or at home engaged in discussions with his hosts and other people who would come to visit him. He would wake up after a short sleep around 4:00 A.M. and begin his day by again taking a couple of sips of Scotch.[Kaur 1998].

Final days
When Shiv returned from England in September 1972, his health had declined visibly. He was now bitterly complaining about the undue criticism of his poetry by the progressive and leftist writers. He openly started talking about his disappointment at the unjustified condemnation of his poetry. [Gargi 2000 'Surme Walee Akhah' ]. Within a couple of months after his return from England, his health started sinking, never to recover again. He was in a dire financial predicament during those days and felt that most of his friends had deserted him in his time of need. His wife Arun, somehow managed to get him admitted in a hospital in Sector 16 of Chandigarh where he received treatment for a few days. A couple of months later, he was admitted in a hospital in Amritsar, but left it on his own against the advice of his doctors. He didn't want to die in a hospital and simply walked out of the hospital and went to his family home in Batala. He was later shifted to the village of his in-laws, Kiri Mangial, a small village near the border with Pakistan. Shiv Kumar Batalvi died in Kiri Mangial during the early morning hours of 6 May 1973.

Death
After Shiv Kumar Batalvi returned from his England tour in 1972, he got affected by liver cirrhosis. His health issues put the family in a financial crisis. This was possibly the reason Shiv Kumar Batalvi along with his wife Aruna Batalvi moved to Shiv's maternal village, where he breathed his last.

Legacy
One of his anthology, Alvida (Farewell) was published posthumously in 1974, by the Guru Nanak Dev University, Amritsar. 'Shiv Kumar Batalvi Award' for Best Writer, is given each year.

Shiv Kumar Batalvi Auditorium is constructed to commemorate 75th Birth anniversary of the eminent poet of Punjab in Batala. It is situated in Jalandhar Road, Batala. A world-class auditorium to inspire generations to come in Punjab.

Publications

 Piran da Paraga (The Scarful of Sorrows) (1960)
Lajwanti (1961)
Aate Diyan Chiriyaan (1962)
 Mainu Vida Karo (Bid Me Farewell) (1963)
Dardmandan Diyan Aahin (1964)
Birha Tu Sultan (1964)
Loona (1965)
Main Te Main (I and Me) (1970)
 Aarti (Prayer) (1971)
Samuchi kavita

Source:

In media
Many of his poems were sung by Deedar Singh Pardesi. Jagjit Singh-Chitra Singh, and Surinder Kaur, have also sung many of his poems. Nusrat Fateh Ali Khan's rendition of one of his poem "Maye Ni Maye" is known for its soulfulness and imagery.Punjabi singer Babbu Maan perform his poem 'Shabab' in his album 'Ohi chan Ohi ratan (2004). Rabbi Shergill's debut album Rabbi (2004) features his poem "Ishtihar". Punjabi folk singer, Hans Raj Hans also did a popular album, 'Gham', on the poetry of Shiv Kumar. In 2005, a compilation album was released, titled, Ek Kudi Jida Naa Mohabbat... 'Shiv Kumar Batalvi, with numbers sung by Mahendra Kapoor, Jagjit Singh and Asa Singh Mastana.

In 2004, Punjabi play titled Dardaan Da Darya based on the life of Shiv Kumar was performed at 'Punjab Kala Bhavan', Chandigarh.

Several of his poems have been adapted for movies, e.g. "Ajj Din Chhadeya Tere Rang Varga," was adapted in 2009 Hindi movie Love Aaj Kal which became an instant hit.

In 2012, Album titled "Panchee Ho javan" based on a same-titled poem written by Shiv Kumar Batalvi was sung by Jasleen Royal and the album also contains another song "Maye Ni" based on the poem "Maye Ni Maye".

In 2014, rap duo "Swet Shop Boys", consisting of Indo-American Himanshu Suri, and British Pakistani Riz Ahmed, released a song entitled "Batalvi" which sampled Shiv Kumar Batalvi's own recitation of "Ikk Kudi Jihda Naam Mohabbat Ghum Hai" from an interview done with Aikam TV in the early 1970s. The song's lyrics explore issues regarding cultural identity faced by many second-generation south Asians living in the west.

Also in 2014, Pakistani pop singer Sarmad Qadeer scored a hit single on the official Asian Download chart in the UK with his interpretation of "Maiye Ni Maiye".

His poem "Ikk Kudi Jihda Naam Mohabbat Ghum Hai" was made into a song featured in Udta Punjab. Featuring Alia Bhatt, it was sung by Shahid Mallya and later reprised by Diljit Dosanjh.

In 2016, Punjabi rapper Kay Kap's album "Kaagaz" featured a song entitled Pind Bewafaayiyaan which was inspired & conceptualized from Shiv Kumar Batalvi's poem "Ikk Kudi Jihda Naam Mohabbat Ghum Hai". The song's lyrics concluded from the lost girl named 'Mohabbat (Love)' belonging to the village named 'Bewafaayiyaan (Betrayal)' thus, giving birth to a new theory based on Shiv Kumar's poem that forms a different set of consequences.

In 2022, his poem "Thabba Ku Zulfa Waleya" was made into a song, sung by Arjan Dhillon

References

Further reading
 Makers of Indian Literature: Shiv Kumar Batalvi, by Prof. S.Soze, Published by Sahitya Akademi, 2001. .
 Shiv Kumar Batalvi : Jeevan Ate Rachna
 Shiv Batalvi: A Solitary and Passionate singer, by Om Prakash Sharma, 1979, Sterling Publishers, New Delhi LCCN: 79–905007.
 Shiv Kumar Batalvi, Jiwan Te Rachna, by Dr. Jit Singh Sital. LCCN: 83-900413
 Shiv Kumar da Kavi Jagat, by Dharam Pal Singola. LCCN: 79-900386
 Shiv Kumar, Rachna Samsar, by Amarik Singh Punni. LCCN: 90-902390
 Shiv Kumar, Kavi vich Birah; by Surjit Singh Kanwal. LCCN: 88-901976

External links
 Poems of Shiv Kumar Batalvi
 Shiv Batalvi www.Shivbatalvi.com
 A biography on Shiv Kumar Batalvi
 A great collection of Shiv Kumar Batalvi's Poems
 All Poetry Books of Shiv Kumar Batalvi
Shiv Kumar Batalvi’s interview by BBC

1936 births
1973 deaths
Indian lyricists
Punjabi-language singers
Punjabi-language poets
Punjabi-language writers
Punjabi people
Indian male dramatists and playwrights
Recipients of the Sahitya Akademi Award in Punjabi
People from Barapind
Deaths from cirrhosis
Romantic poets
Alcohol-related deaths in India
20th-century Indian poets
20th-century Indian dramatists and playwrights
20th-century Indian singers
Indian male poets
Poets from Punjab, India
Dramatists and playwrights from Punjab, India
20th-century Indian male writers